The 1995 Miller Genuine Draft 400 was the 14th stock car race of the 1995 NASCAR Winston Cup Series and the 14th iteration of the event. The race was held on Sunday, June 18, 1995, in Brooklyn, Michigan, at Michigan International Speedway, a two-mile (3.2 km) moderate-banked D-shaped speedway. The race took the scheduled 200 laps to complete. On the final restart with 16 to go, Joe Gibbs Racing driver Bobby Labonte would manage to make a charge to the front and race to his second career NASCAR Winston Cup Series victory and his second victory of the season. To fill out the top three, Hendrick Motorsports driver Jeff Gordon and Penske Racing South driver Rusty Wallace would finish second and third, respectively.

Background 

The race was held at Michigan International Speedway, a two-mile (3.2 km) moderate-banked D-shaped speedway located in Brooklyn, Michigan. The track is used primarily for NASCAR events. It is known as a "sister track" to Texas World Speedway as MIS's oval design was a direct basis of TWS, with moderate modifications to the banking in the corners, and was used as the basis of Auto Club Speedway. The track is owned by International Speedway Corporation. Michigan International Speedway is recognized as one of motorsports' premier facilities because of its wide racing surface and high banking (by open-wheel standards; the 18-degree banking is modest by stock car standards).

Entry list 

 (R) denotes rookie driver.

Qualifying 
Qualifying was split into two rounds. The first round was held on Friday, June 16, at 3:30 PM EST. Each driver would have one lap to set a time. During the first round, the top 20 drivers in the round would be guaranteed a starting spot in the race. If a driver was not able to guarantee a spot in the first round, they had the option to scrub their time from the first round and try and run a faster lap time in a second round qualifying run, held on Saturday, June 17, at 11:00 AM EST. As with the first round, each driver would have one lap to set a time. For this specific race, positions 21-38 would be decided on time, and depending on who needed it, a select amount of positions were given to cars who had not otherwise qualified but were high enough in owner's points.

Two drivers would fail to qualify.

Full qualifying results

Race results

References 

1995 NASCAR Winston Cup Series
NASCAR races at Michigan International Speedway
June 1995 sports events in the United States
1995 in sports in Michigan